Daniel May may refer to:

Daniel Boone May (1852–1878), American gunfighter
Daniel C. M. May (born 1973), Australian tech entrepreneur
Daniel May (composer), American composer of film and television music, brother of Jonathan May
Dan May (1898–1982), American business, educational and civic leader
Danny May (born 1988), English footballer

See also
Daniel Mays (born 1978), English actor